Ana Martins Marques (born November 7, 1977) is a Brazilian poet.

Life 
Marques was born in Belo Horizonte. She has a master's degree in literature and a doctorate in compared literature at the Federal University of Minas Gerais. She works as an editor and proofreader for the Minas Gerais State Legislative Assembly.

Her first book, A vida submarina (2009), is a collection of poems awarded the Prêmio Cidade de Belo Horizonte in 2007 and 2008. She was also awarded the Prêmio Alphonsus de Guimaraens, for her second book, Da arte das armadilhas (2011).

Published works 

 2009 – A vida submarina (Scriptum)
 2011 – Da arte das armadilhas (Companhia das Letras)
 2015 – O Livro das Semelhanças (Companhia das Letras)
 2016 – Duas Janelas – com Marcos Siscar (Luna Parque Edições)
 2017 – Como se fosse a casa (uma correspondência) – with Eduardo Jorge (Relicário)
 2019 – Livro dos jardins (Quelonio)
 2021 – Risque esta palavra (Companhia das Letras)

Works in English
 2017 – This House: Selected poems by Ana Martins Marques - translated by Elisa Wouk Almino (Scrambler Books)

References 

Living people
1977 births
21st-century Brazilian poets
Brazilian women poets
Brazilian women writers
People from Belo Horizonte
Federal University of Minas Gerais alumni